Phil Oberlander (born 17 August 1939) is a Canadian wrestler. At the 1961 Maccabiah Games in Israel, he won a gold medal in the middleweight class in Greco-Roman wrestling. Collegiately, Oberlander wrestled at Cornell University.

He competed in the men's freestyle welterweight division at the 1964 Summer Olympics, representing Canada.

References

1939 births
Living people
Canadian male sport wrestlers
Olympic wrestlers of Canada
Wrestlers at the 1964 Summer Olympics
Sportspeople from London
Commonwealth Games medallists in wrestling
Commonwealth Games silver medallists for Canada
Wrestlers at the 1962 British Empire and Commonwealth Games
English Jews
Jewish Canadian sportspeople
Jewish wrestlers
Maccabiah Games gold medalists for Canada
Maccabiah Games medalists in wrestling
Competitors at the 1961 Maccabiah Games
Medallists at the 1962 British Empire and Commonwealth Games